Kamuning Church, officially known as the Diocesan Shrine and Parish of the Sacred Heart of Jesus is a Roman Catholic parish in the Kamuning District of Quezon City in the Philippines. It was established by Manila Archbishop Michael J. O'Doherty on October 3, 1941, making it the first parish to be erected in Quezon City after the city's inception in 1939 (although the present-day churches in Novaliches and San Francisco del Monte were in existence already in the areas now located in the city). 

Sacred Heart Church is located at the intersection of Scout Ybardolaza Street, Scout Fuentebella Street, and Scout Fernandez Street. Despite its historical familiarity as the Church of Kamuning, it presently belongs to Barangay Sacred Heart, not Barangay Kamuning. The parish is part of the Diocese of Cubao.

The parish celebrates its annual fiesta on the movable feast Solemnity of the Most Sacred Heart according to the liturgical calendar of the Catholic Church, the Friday right after the Solemnity of the Body and Blood of Christ, also known as Corpus Christi.

Administered by the Society of the Divine Word (SVD) ever since even before its founding as a parish, the Sacred Heart Church has been an important center of religious activities in Kamuning District, also known as Barrio Obrero II, which was a government housing project by then Philippine Commonwealth President Manuel Luis Quezon for government employees and their families. Late in 1939, the Kamuning Residents' Association sought pastoral care from the SVD fathers, who later celebrated the first Mass where the Kamuning Public Market now stands on that year's Christmas Eve. On October 1, 1941, the Sacred Heart of Jesus Parish was established by Manila Archbishop Michael J. O'Doherty. It has been in the care of the SVD missionaries since then. In the early 1940s, the parish boundaries reached as far east toward Loyola Heights and westward up to the Mabuhay Rotonda. Today, the parish covers five barangays – Sacred Heart, Kamuning, South Triangle, Kristong Hari, and part of Obrero. According to Philippines 2000 Census, the parish jurisdiction has a resident population of 43,074 people.

On October 1, 2016, the 75th foundation year of the parish, Bishop Honesto Ongtioco declared the Sacred Heart Parish as a diocesan shrine. Its official name is Diocesan Shrine and Parish of the Sacred Heart of Jesus or Sacred Heart Parish-Shrine.

Parish Priests

 1. Fr. Theodore Buttenbruch, SVD † (1941-1944)
 2. Fr. Johann Simon, SVD † (1944-1946)
 3. Fr. Antonio Albrecht, SVD † (1946-1958)
 4. Fr. Fernando de Pedro, SVD † (1961-1969)
 5. Fr. Adeodato Malabanan, SVD † (1969-1979)
 6. Fr. Restituto A. Lumanlan, SVD † (1979-1981)
 7. Fr. Virgilio S. Mascardo, SVD (1981-1985)
 8. Fr. Manuel B. Bongayan, SVD (1985-1990)
 9. Fr. John O' Mahony, SVD (1990-1996)
 10. Fr. Romeo M. Castro, SVD (1996-2002)
 11. Fr. Manuel B. Bongayan, SVD (2002-2008)
 12. Fr. Eduardo L. Guarin, SVD (2008-2011)
 13. Fr. Jerome A. Marquez, SVD (2011-2018)
 14. Fr. Randolf C. Flores, SVD (2018–present)
Current members of the clergy pastoral team: Fr. Jose Caballes, SVD; Fr. Fernando Santos, SVD; Fr. Sedfrey Nebres, SVD, and Fr. Uili Uvea, SVD

Boundaries
North: EDSA-Quezon Ave. to Timog Ave.
East: EDSA-Diliman Creek-Kamuning Road to Quezon Ave.
South: Diliman Creek from EDSA to T. Gener St. & Kamuning Public Market Area
West: Timog Ave. to Morato Ave. and Scout Chuatoco Road along boundary with Roxas District to Diliman Creek and the San Juan River - E. Rodriguez Sr. Ave. to Judge Jimenez

Vision
A community of Christ-like disciples empowered and sent through effective servant-leadership moving towards becoming a church of the poor under the patronage of the Sacred Heart of Jesus

Ministries 
Below is the list of existing ministries in Sacred Heart Parish-Shrine - Kamuning with its respective heads/coordinators.

Facilities
Schools:
 ALS (Alternative Learning System) Sacred Heart, Padre Doro Hall, Sacred Heart Parish-Shrine
 Christ the King Mission Seminary 101 E. Rodriguez Ave., Q.C.
 PAREF-Northfield School 107 Sct. Gandia St., Q.C.
 PAREF-Rosefield School 102 Sct. Fuentabella St., Q.C.
 Cradle of Joy Center for Learning 14 11th Jamboree St., Q.C.
 Tomas Morato Elementary School T. Gener St., Quezon City
 Don Alejandro Roces Sr. Science-Technology High School A. Roces Avenue, Quezon City
 Quezon City High School Sct. Ybardolaza St., Quezon City
 Marcelo H. del Pilar Elem. School K-3rd St., Quezon City
 Kamuning Elementary School Sct. Torillo St., Quezon City

Hospitals:
 Dr. Jesus C. Delgado Memorial Hospital 7 Kamuning Rd., Quezon City

Mortuary:
 Sacred Heart Parish Shrine Mortuary (St. Peter Life Plans and Chapels)

Charitable and Social Institutions:
 Arnold Janssen Catholic Mission Foundation, Padre Doro Hall, Sacred Heart Parish-Shrine

Religious Congregations
Religious Men:
 Congregation of the Blessed Sacrament (SSS) 20 Sunnyside Dr., New Manila, Q.C.
 Monfort Missionaries (SMM) 47 Sct. Madriñan St., Q.C.
 Society of the Divine Word (SVD) 101 E. Rodriguez Ave., Q.C.
 Missionaries of the Sacred Heart (MSC) 10 17th St., New Manila, Q.C.
 Congregation of the Sacred Heart of Jesus and Mary (SS.CC) 104 Sct. Limbaga St., Q.C.
 Congregation of Sons of Charity (FdCC) 7 17th St., New Manila, Q.C.

Religious Women:
 Carmelite Missionary Sisters (CM) 19 Sct. Madriñan St., Q.C.
 Carmelite Missionary of Sisters of St. Therese of the Child Jesus (CMSSTCJ) 22 Sct. Ignacia St., New Manila, Q.C.
 Congregation of the Sacred Heart of Jesus and Mary (SS.CC) 104 Sct. Limbaga St., Q.C.
 Faithful Companions of Jesus (FCJ) 46-B Sct. Borromeo St., Q.C.
 Religious of the Sacred Heart (RSCJ) 53 K-4th St., Kamuning, Q.C.
 Missionary Sisters of St. Charles Scalabrinians (MSCS) 132 Panay Ave., Q.C.

References

Two commemorative books contain details of the history of the Sacred Heart of Jesus Parish - Kamuning: Age of Gold (Golden Jubilee) and Sanlakbay 2001 (Diamond Jubilee). Limited copies of the two books were published and a few copies are with the parish office for reference use.

External links

Website
Arnold Janssen Catholic Mission Foundation
The Roman Catholic Diocese of Cubao
The Official Website of the Philippine Central Province of the Society of the Divine Word
Local Superiors and Council of Members of the SVD-PHC Manila District

Roman Catholic churches in Quezon City
Divine Word Missionaries Order
1941 establishments in the Philippines
Roman Catholic churches completed in 1941
20th-century Roman Catholic church buildings in the Philippines
Churches in the Roman Catholic Diocese of Cubao